Claudio Nasco (17 June 1976 – 13 December 2013) was a Cuban journalist and newscaster.

Born in Matanzas, Nasco began his career in the early 2000s when he became a newscaster for Cadena de Noticias (CDN), Dominican Republic.

Claudio Nasco was stabbed to death on 13 December 2013, aged 37, at a motel in Santo Domingo, Dominican Republic.

References

1976 births
2013 deaths
People from Matanzas
Cuban journalists
Male journalists
Cuban television personalities
Cuban expatriates in the Dominican Republic
People murdered in the Dominican Republic
Journalists killed in the Dominican Republic
Deaths by stabbing in the Dominican Republic
Cuban people murdered abroad